Francisco Pérez may refer to:

Arts and Entertainment
 Paco Pérez (Francisco Pérez Muñoz, 1917–1951), Guatemalan singer, composer and guitarist
 Narf (singer) (1968–2016), Galician singer-songwriter

Politicians
 Francisco Antonio Pérez (1764–1828), Chilean political figure
 Francisco Flores Pérez (born 1959), President of El Salvador, 1999–2004
 Francisco Pérez (general), Mexican commander at the Battle of Buena Vista
 Francisco Pérez (governor) (born 1969), Governor of Mendoza Province, Argentina

Sportspeople

Association football
 Fran Pérez (footballer, born 1986), (Francisco Pérez Caso), Spanish football centre-back
 Fran Pérez (footballer, born 1992) (Francisco Pérez Gil), Spanish football midfielder
 Fran Pérez (footballer, born 2002) (Francisco Pérez Martínez), Spanish football winger

Other sports
 Francisco José Pérez (1920–1999), Spanish/Cuban chess player
 Francisco Pérez (cyclist) (born 1934), Uruguayan Olympic cyclist
 Francisco Pérez (sport shooter) (born 1940), Spanish sports shooter
 Francisco Pérez (athlete) (born 1969), Paralympic athlete from Spain
 Francisco Pérez (diver) (born 1976), Mexican Olympic diver
 Francisco Pérez Sanchez (born 1978), Spanish road bicycle racer
 Francisco Pérez (baseball) (born 1997), baseball player